The  3rd Moscow Jewish Film Festival is an annual international film festival, which aims to gather in the program features, documentaries, shorts and animated films on the subject of Jewish culture, history and national identity and contemporary problems. The festival was held in Moscow from 12 to 20 June 2017, at the Jewish Museum and Tolerance Center, Documentary Film Center, cinema GUM and KARO 11 cinema Oktyabr.

Opening film
Opening film of the festival was The Bloom of Yesterday directed by Chris Kraus. The film was presented by famous German actor Lars Eidinger. The opening ceremony was held in cinema Oktyabr which gathered about 1,600 spectators.

Jury 
 Pavel Lungin — President of the jury, director, screenwriter and producer
 Igor Ugolnikov — actor, producer, director, screenwriter
 Dmitry Astrakhan — Film and theatre director, actor, producer
 Julia Aug — theatre and film actor and director
 Artyom Vitkin — screenwriter, director, producer
 Elena Khazanova — director
 Arkady Ukupnik — composer, pop singer, actor, music producer

Public Council 
For the first time a public council, which included filmmakers and leaders of the Jewish community, was created.
 Alexander Boroda, Chairman of the Public Council — Rabbi, the President of the Federation of Jewish Communities of Russia, Founder and General Director of the Jewish Museum and Tolerance Center, a member of the Civic Chamber of the Russian Federation
 Yuri Kanner — President of Russian Jewish Congress, Vice President and member of the steering committee of World Jewish Congress
 Dorit Golender — diplomat, public figure, former Plenipotentiary Ambassador of the State of Israel in the Russian Federation (2010-2015)
 Alexander Mitta — film director, screenwriter
 Dmitry Litvinov — producer
 Denis Ruzayev — film сritic
 Susanna Alperina — journalist, writer
 David Schneiderov — television and radio presenter, film critic
 Vadim Rutkovsky — film critic, journalist

Creators
 CEO and producer — Egor Odintsov
 Program director — Vanya Bowden
 Producer — Konstantin Fam
 Educational director — Michael Libkin
 Educational manager — Tatyana Bezhenar
 Executive producer — Edita Bleikh
 PR director — Elena Barkova

Program

Competition 
  Narrative Feature:
 Abulele (2015) — Israel
 The Bloom of Yesterday (2016) — Germany, France, Austria
 Dirty Wolves (2015) — Spain
 Demon (2015) — Poland, Israel
 The Jews (2016) — France, Belgium
 The Law (2014) — France
 The Liberation of Skopje (2016) — Macedonia
 Song of Songs (2015) — Ukraine
 Stefan Zweig: Farewell to Europe(2016) — Germany, France, Austria
 We had a forest (2016) — Israel
 Across the Waters (2016) — Denmark
  Documentary Feature:
 In Search of Israeli Cuisine (2016) — United States
 Bring the Jews Home (2016) — Netherlands
 Dimona Twist (2016) — Israel
 A Woman's Story (2015) — Canada
 Who's Gonna Love Me Now? (2016) — Israel, United Kingdom 
 Liga Terezin (2012) — Czech Republic, Israel
 Mr Gaga (2015) — Israel
 Moritz Daniel Oppenheim – The first Jewish painter (2016) — Germany
 Levinsky Park (2016) — United States
 Escape from Room 18 (2017) — Israel
 Rabin In His Own Words (2015) — Israel
 The Storyteller. After Walter Benjamin (2016) — Germany
 Tel Aviv. Live (2016) — Israel
  Narrative Short:
 Curpigeon (2016) — United States
 In Other Words (2015) — Israel
 Irving (2016) — United States
 Wig Shop (2016) — United States
 Mordechai (2016) — United Kingdom
 The Chop (2015) — United Kingdom
 Weeping Willows (2017) — Germany
 Weeping Willows (2016) — Israel
 An Old Score (2016) — Israel
  Documentary Short:
 800 Jews from our Town (2015) — Poland
 War Scarred Berlin (2015) — Germany
 Spring Chicken (2016) — United States
 Sugihara Survivors: Jewish and Japanese, past and future (2017)  — United Kingdom, Japan
 Home Movie (2013) — United Kingdom
 Our Hebrews (2016) — Israel
 German Shepherd (2014) — Sweden
 The Last Blintz (2015) — United States
 Journey Birds (2015) — Israel
 Joe's Violin (2016) — United States
 70 Hester Street (2014) — United States

Out of Competition 
  Special screenings:
 Arbeit Macht Frei (2009) — Israel
 Brutus (2016) — Russia, Ukraine, Belarus, Romania, United States, Israel
 Another Planet (2017) — Israel
 Zigzag of luck. Emil Braginsky (2016) — Russia
 Paradise (2016) — Russia, France
 Kholodnoe tango (2017) — Russia

Education
In addition to film screenings educational program was organized in the framework of the festival, consisting of lectures, discussions and debates. A famous film director and screenwriter Andrei Konchalovsky told about unique personal ideas of paradise and about how they relate to collective past experiences. Nikolay Polissky is a protagonist of the film The storyteller. After Walter Benjamin, a Russian artist, a founder of the Archstoyanie festival and Nikola Lenivets art park discussed with the film’s audience the power of conceptual thinking. Tatyana Tarasova and Yuval Rabin had a conversation about life and tragic death of Yitzhak Rabin.Isabel Gathof is the screenwriter and director of the film Moritz Daniel Oppenheim – The first Jewish painter spoke about why Moritz Oppenheim’s life and art matter today. Naor Meningher is an independent film director, and the author of the short documentary Our Hebrews discussed the phenomenon of small Jewish communities. Arseniy Semenov is a lead actor in the film Song of Songs told about Sholem Aleichem and what was everyday life like for the Jews in the beginning of the 20th century.
As a part of the special event Another Planet. Why do we need a virtual Auschwitz? a film director Amir Yatsiv and film critic Larysa Malyukova discussed the rare genre of the animated documentary. Leila Guchmazova is a ballet critica jury member of the National Theatre Award "Golden Mask" gave a lecture about a famous Israeli Ohad Naharin. Ilya Altman discussed with the audience alternative ways of escape from horrors of the Holocaust.

Events 
The 3rd Moscow Jewish Film Festival will open with the screening of The Bloom of Yesterday directed by Chris Kraus. The picture will be presented by Lars Eidinger. The closing ceremony of the 3rd Moscow Jewish Film Festival was held in the Jewish Museum and Tolerance Center. The jurors have presented awards in each of the four competition categories and one special prize. And also held a special screening of the war drama Kholodnoe tango directed by Pavel Chukhray. The film was presented by actress Yulia Peresild, producer Sabina Eremeeva and cameraman Igor Klebanov.
It was also announced that an award named after Yakov Kaller is going to be established. It will be presented to the best film of the Moscow Jewish Film Festival’s program that was made in Russia. This year, the award went to the film Brutus directed by Konstantin Fam.

Winners 
 Winner of nomination Narrative Feature —  The Bloom of Yesterday (2016)
 Winner of nomination Documentary Feature — Who's Gonna Love Me Now? (2016)
 Winner of nomination Narrative Short — In Other Words (2015)
 Winner of nomination Documentary Short — Joe's Violin (2016)
 Special jury prize — Song of Songs (2015)
 Honorable prize for outstanding contribution to the development of Jewish cinema in Russia — Andrei Konchalovsky

Partners 
 Russian Jewish Congress
 Federation of Jewish Communities of Russia
 Jewish Museum and Tolerance Center
 Genesis Philanthropy Group
 The network of cinemas "Karo"
 Jewish Agency for Israel
 UJA-Federation of New York
 Jewish Business Club "Solomon"
 Ark Pictures

See also
 Ekaterinburg Jewish Film Festival

References

External links 
 Official website

Jewish film festivals in Europe
Film festivals in Russia
2017 film festivals
2017 in Russian cinema